Byron is an unincorporated community in Kankakee Township, LaPorte County, Indiana.

History
Byron was laid out and platted in 1836. Byron was once considered a center of trade in the area. With the construction of the Northern Indiana Railroad, business activity shifted to other towns, particularly nearby Rolling Prairie, and Byron's population dwindled.

Geography

References

Unincorporated communities in LaPorte County, Indiana
Unincorporated communities in Indiana